Adolf of Burgundy (1489–1540) was Lord of Veere and admiral of the Netherlands.

Family 
Adolf was a son of Philip of Burgundy-Beveren and Anna van Borselen. This would one day make him Lord of Veere. The family resided at Zandenburg, near Veere.

Life 
In 1517 Adolf succeeded Philip of Burgundy-Blaton, who became Bishop of Utrecht, as admiral of the Netherlands until 1540.

In 1509 he married Anna of Bergen, daughter of John III of Bergen op Zoom. He had been taught by Jacob Badt, a friend of Erasmus.

Adolf of Burgundy-Beveren also became Knight in the Order of the Golden Fleece in 1515. 

Adolf and Anne had 7 children:
 Philip, (1512–1512)
 Maximilian II of Burgundy (1514–1558), married 1542 Louise de Croy (1524–1585), daughter of Philippe II de Croÿ
 Anne, (1516–1551), married 1530 Jacob III of Horn (killed in 1531) and 1532 Jean V. de Hénin
 Henry, (1519–1532)
 Jacqueline, (1523–1556), married John II of Praet (died 1545), son of Louis of Praet and 1549 John VI of Kruiningen
 A daughter (1526–1526)
 Antoinette, (1529–1588) married 1549 Charles II de Croÿ (killed 1551) and 1569 Jacques d’Anneux.

Knights of the Golden Fleece
1489 births
1540 deaths